The Fitness Show is an educational television program, hosted by Colin Hoobler. The series, filmed in Portland, Oregon. is the first medically based fitness program to apply science to exercise. This is in the likeness of the series’ producers’ Emmy Award-winning program Bill Nye the Science Guy.

Like Bill Nye, Hoobler hosts the program as part motivator and part science teacher. Sensors and 3-D image-capturing technology show viewers in real time what goes on underneath the skin during exercise.

As a licensed physical therapist with two master's degrees, Hoobler’s methods have been taught through the American Physical Therapy Association. Both medical doctors and physical therapists make guest appearances on The Fitness Show. Techniques demonstrated in episodes combine elements of anatomy, neuroscience, physics and sports medicine.  The educational content is intended to help viewers save time, avoid invasive medical treatments and reduce chronic pain.

Topics
The following is a list of topics covered in the series:

Trivia
 Hoobler competed as a nationally ranked drug-free bodybuilder for eight years.
 In Portland you can order from "Colin’s Menu" at Oba! Restaurant.

External links
 The Fitness Show Official Blog

2008 American television series debuts
Exercise television shows
PBS original programming